Lagostomus is a South American genus of rodents in the family Chinchillidae. It contains a single living species, the plains viscacha, and it is the only Holocene genus in the subfamily Lagostominae.

References 

Chinchillidae
Rodent genera
Mammal genera with one living species
Taxa named by Joshua Brookes
Taxa named by Johann Rudolph Rengger
Taxonomy articles created by Polbot